Spencer Bell (September 25, 1887 – August 18, 1935) was an American stage and film actor, best known for playing opposite Larry Semon in many of his silent comedy shorts from the late 1910s to 1928. Bell was one of the first African American comedic actors of the silent film era, and was the first to be signed to film contract. Over the course of his fifteen-year film career, Bell appeared in more than seventy comedy shorts.

Career
Bell was born in Lexington, Kentucky. Prior to his Hollywood film career, he worked as a chauffeur and performed in vaudeville and minstrel shows. He 
enlisted in the United States Army and served in World War I. Bell made his film debut in Larry Semon's 1919 silent comedy short, Passing the Buck. As was typical for African American actors of the era, Bell was typecast in stereotypical roles. His characters were often depicted as bumbling, lazy buffoons who were prone to comedic accidents.

One of Bell's most notable roles was that of Snowball/Rastus/the Cowardly Lion in Larry Semon's The Wizard of Oz (1925),
In that film, Semon credited Bell under the stage name "G. Howe Black" (In a mainly positive review, a Variety critic admonished Semon for crediting Bell with the demeaning name writing that Bell, "deserved [a] better fate"). He was again credited as such in Semon's 1925 silent slapstick film, The Perfect Clown. During the 1930s, Bell regularly appeared in the Mickey McGuire film series starring Mickey Rooney, and briefly ran an acting troupe in Harlem. Bell's final film appearance was in the 1934 comedy short Mickey's Medicine Man.

Death
On August 18, 1935, Bell died at his home in Los Angeles, California of complications from abdominal surgery he underwent in July 1935. He is buried at Sawtelle Military Cemetery (now known as Los Angeles National Cemetery).

Selected filmography

References

External links

1887 births
1935 deaths
20th-century American male actors
Actors from Lexington, Kentucky
African-American male actors
American male film actors
American male silent film actors
American male stage actors
United States Army personnel of World War I
Blackface minstrel performers
Burials at Los Angeles National Cemetery
Male actors from Kentucky
Silent film comedians
United States Army soldiers
Vaudeville performers
20th-century American comedians
American male comedy actors
20th-century American singers
20th-century African-American male singers